Friedrich Müller may refer to:

 Maler Müller (Friedrich Müller, 1749–1825), German painter and poet
 Friedrich Christoph Müller (1751–1808), theologian and cartographer in Schwelm
 Max Müller (Friedrich Maximillian Müller, 1823–1900), German-British philologist and indologist known for his work on Sanskrit and Hinduism
 Friedrich Konrad Müller (1823–1881), German poet, journalist and physician
 Friedrich Müller (linguist) (1834–1898), Austrian linguist, known for his work on African languages
 Friedrich von Müller (1858–1941), German physician
 Friedrich W. K. Müller (1863–1930), German scholar of oriental cultures and languages, known for his work on Tocharian and Sogdian
 Friedrich Mueller, also known as Eugen Sandow (1867–1925), German bodybuilder
 Friedrich-Wilhelm Müller (1897-1947), German World War II General
 Friedrich Müller (footballer) (1907–1978), German international footballer of the 1930s
 Friedrich-Karl "Tutti" Müller (1916–1944), German World War II fighter pilot